The 1972 Arkansas gubernatorial election was held on November 7, 1972.

Incumbent Democratic Governor Dale Bumpers defeated Republican nominee Len E. Blaylock with 75.44% of the vote.

Primary elections
Primary elections were held on May 30, 1972.

Democratic primary

Candidates
Dale Bumpers, incumbent Governor
George W. Davis, State Representative
Les Gibbs, Former Labor Union official
Mack Harbour, Hospital administrator
Q. Byrum Hurst, State Senator

Results
Bumpers avoided a run-off (which would have been held 13 June) by winning with more than 50% of the vote.

Republican primary

Candidates
Len E. Blaylock, former staffer and Welfare Commissioner under Winthrop Rockefeller

Results

General election

Candidates
Dale Bumpers, Democratic
Len E. Blaylock, Republican

Results

References

Bibliography
 
 
 

1972
Arkansas
Gubernatorial
November 1972 events in the United States